"The Cadillac" is an hour-long, two-part episode of NBC sitcom Seinfeld. It was the 124th and 125th episode and 14th and 15th episode for the seventh season. It aired on February 8, 1996. This was the last episode to be co-written by Jerry Seinfeld.

In this episode, Jerry's gift of a Cadillac for his parents causes political difficulties for Morty and triggers gold digger instincts in Elaine, Kramer takes revenge on his cable company by not being at home when they show up, and George becomes obsessed with the possibility of a date with Academy Award-winning actress Marisa Tomei (who plays herself in the episode).

Plot

Part 1
Jerry comes back from a high-paying gig and surprises his parents by buying them a new Cadillac Fleetwood; learning about his financial situation, Elaine begins hitting on Jerry. Jack Klompus doesn’t believe Jerry is successful enough to buy his parents a car, and accuses Morty of embezzling funds from the office of condo president to buy the Cadillac, leading to impeachment proceedings. The Seinfelds' neighbor Evelyn tells them that the decision hinges on one undecided vote, board member Mabel Choate.

The Plaza Cable company wants to enter Kramer's apartment and disable HBO and Showtime, which he has been getting for free. Kramer makes sure he is not at home when they arrive, to retaliate for making him wait over nine hours for them when his cable was installed.

Katy Ashe, Elaine's friend, reveals she is friends with actress Marisa Tomei. Katy tells George that he is Marisa's type and that she would have set them up on a date if he was still single. Awed at the thought that he could have dated an Oscar winner, George belatedly decides it wouldn't count as cheating to meet Marisa for a cup of coffee. He obsesses with getting Marisa's phone number, to the point of harassing Katy when she is in the hospital with an arrhythmia.

Part 2
The Seinfelds meet with Mabel, who Jerry recognizes as the woman from whom he stole a marble rye in "The Rye". Jerry takes his leave as Morty explains his side of the story in order to get Mabel's vote.

George obtains Marisa's phone number and works with Elaine to create a cover story involving Elaine and her fictitious boyfriend, an "import-exporter". George and Marisa have a date in the park. Marisa is enchanted by George, but when he tells her he is engaged, she is furious, decking him and storming off. Susan suspects George is having an affair with Elaine and separately questions George and Elaine regarding what her boyfriend imports. Elaine says potato chips; George says matches, and receives his second punching that day.

The board votes against impeachment. In frustration, Jack calls Mabel an "old bag," triggering her memory of Jerry robbing her. Mabel tells everyone it was Morty's son who stole the rye bread from her, and the board unanimously votes for Morty's impeachment. As vice-president, Jack becomes the new condo president. The Seinfelds leave the condo.

The cable guy chases Kramer, but he gets away. The cable guy finally concedes defeat and apologizes on behalf of cable guys everywhere, promising better service across the board. Kramer appears and has an emotional reconciliation with the cable guy.

Production
The inspiration for the episode came when Larry David bought a Lexus for his father, who was president of his condominium in Florida, and started wondering what the other residents would think of him having a Lexus. Like most of Seinfelds one-hour time slot episodes, "The Cadillac" was initially conceived as a normal half-hour show. The original script was filmed on January 10, and ran well over the 23 minutes allotted for a half-hour time slot. While this was not unusual for Seinfeld, in this case Larry David and Jerry Seinfeld decided it would be easier to pad the episode out to a one-hour time slot than edit it down to a half hour, so they wrote a number of additional scenes, such as those dealing with the early bird special. The additional scenes, and extended reworkings of existing scenes, were filmed on February 1.

Jerry Seinfeld was a longtime fan of Jesse White, who plays Ralph in the episode, due to his part on The Ann Sothern Show. White gave him his autograph when he was a young boy. The role would become the actor's final performance before his death in 1997.

The chase sequence with Kramer and the cable guy include shots which were filmed in the real New York City with body doubles, and uses stock music from the earlier episode "The Doorman". These scenes reference In the Line of Fire.

The episode's final scene, showing the Seinfelds leaving the condo, is a shot-for-shot parody of the movie Nixon.

Critical reception 
David Sims of The A.V. Club praised the deep politics of the retirement condo story but said the George/Marisa subplot "wraps up too quickly with George just getting his comeuppance from both ladies with none of his usual deviousness."

References

External links
 

Seinfeld (season 7) episodes
1996 American television episodes
Television episodes written by Larry David
Television episodes written by Jerry Seinfeld
Seinfeld episodes in multiple parts
Cadillac